Sébastien Piché (born February 4, 1988) is a Canadian professional ice hockey player who is currently playing for Sheffield Steelers of the UK's Elite Ice Hockey League (EIHL). Piché most recently iced with HK Olimpija and EHC Black Wings Linz of the International Central European IceHL.

Playing career
Piché began his major junior career playing five seasons in the QMJHL before on March 30, 2009, he was signed as a free agent by the Detroit Red Wings.

On February 21, 2012, he was traded along with Detroit's 2012 first round pick to the Tampa Bay Lightning for defenceman Kyle Quincey. On the next day, he was assigned by the Lightning to the Florida Everblades of the ECHL.

As a free agent, Piché was signed to a one-year AHL contract with the Connecticut Whale on September 26, 2012. He was reassigned to ECHL affiliate, the Greenville Road Warriors for the duration of the 2012–13 season.

On August 7, 2013, Piche signed his first European contract, agreeing to a one-year deal as a free agent with HC Bolzano for their first season in the Austrian Hockey League. Piché immediately paid dividends for Bolzano in 2013–14 season, scoring an elite 43 points in just 50 games from the blueline to lead the Foxes. In the EBEL playoffs, Piché contributed with 11 points in 13 games to help Bolzano become the first non-Austrian club, to claim the EBEL Championship.

On May 1, 2014, Piché opted to continue in the EBEL, however left Bolzano to sign with Austrian club EHC Black Wings Linz.

He has since had two spells with EHC Black Wings Linz, and stints in the Czech Republic with Mountfield HK, HC Litvínov, Pirati Chomutov and HC Dynamo Pardubice, with Bratislava Capitals in Slovakia and HK Olimpija in Slovenia.

In August 2022, Piché agreed terms to join UK Elite Ice Hockey League (EIHL) side Sheffield Steelers for the 2022–23 season.

Career statistics

Awards and honours

References

External links

1988 births
Bolzano HC players
Bratislava Capitals players
Canadian ice hockey defencemen
Florida Everblades players
Grand Rapids Griffins players
Greenville Road Warriors players
Lewiston Maineiacs players
EHC Black Wings Linz players
HC Dynamo Pardubice players
HC Litvínov players
Living people
Piráti Chomutov players
Rimouski Océanic players
Rouyn-Noranda Huskies players
Shawinigan Cataractes players
Sheffield Steelers players
Stadion Hradec Králové players
Toledo Walleye players
Canadian expatriate ice hockey players in Austria
Canadian expatriate ice hockey players in Italy
Canadian expatriate ice hockey players in the United States
Canadian expatriate ice hockey players in the Czech Republic
Canadian expatriate ice hockey players in Slovakia
Canadian expatriate ice hockey players in Slovenia
Canadian expatriate ice hockey players in England